Fairyland's Beauty aka The Suitors of Princess Fire-Fly, was edited and translated from the Hungarian by Baroness Orczy (creator of the famous the Scarlet Pimpernel series), in 1895.

The illustrations in the book were provided by her husband, Montagu Barstow, whom she married in 1894.

1895 books
Books by Baroness Orczy
Hungarian fairy tales